The 1920–21 Divizia A was the ninth season of Divizia A, the top-level football league of Romania.

Many years it was recorded that Venus București was the champion in 1921, because of some reports found in the press o the time. However, Romanian journalist Romeo Ionescu uncovered that the actual winner was Unirea Tricolor București, after a victory in the championship final against Venus (3-2).

Final table

References

Liga I seasons
Rom
1920–21 in Romanian football